Passiflora subpeltata, commonly known as white passionflower, is a passion flower bearing yellow-green fruits. It is a vining plant with three-lobed leaves and 2-3 ornate flowers. It is grown as an ornamental plant. This vine is also a marginal pest in areas.

See also
 Passion fruit

subpeltata